Chloé Dumas is a trilingual English/French/Spanish actress born in Toulouse, France.

Her character in A Discovery of Witches was kept secret by Bad Wolf and author Deborah Harkness and wasn't revealed before the series was released on Sky One and Now TV. 

Dumas leads in Kevin Mendiboure's The Follower.
She also leads in Piece Demontee (2018) and Merci pour les cles (2018), two French comedy features. Involved in Uchronia (film), a movie by Christophe Goffette.

Dumas played the lead role in the feature Last Breath (2017), a psychologically damaged wife using violence against her husband. Her performance in the movie was praised and Last Breath won New York City Indie Film Awards (Best Feature Film, Best Directing, Best Acting, Best Editing), Los Angeles Cine Fest, and California Film Awards. She regularly plays in short movies with strong topics as Asperger syndrome (Je suis juste là), Alzheimer's disease (Les Pins Celestes), transgender (Frederique), poverty (El Inquilino), and child abuse (Leo et les bas).

She also is one of the principal performers in Dracula Reborn by Attila Luca, a feature movie distributed on DVD in the UK.

She leads with Bob Odenkirk and Jon Benjamin as Brigitte in the Comedy Central sketch comedy show Jon Benjamin Has a Van.

Dumas acts in Jean-Pierre Mocky's Tu es si jolie ce soir and appeared on American and European television in Bryan Buckley's W7 campaign.

She is Candi in Paris Connections, a mystery movie by the American director Harley Cokeliss, with Nicole Steinwedell, Anthony Delon, Anouk Aimée, and Charles Dance.

The launch of her crazy comedy feature Merci pour les cles is scheduled for 2019.

Films

Television

Stage

References

 
 Chloé Dumas at ActricesDeFrance.org 
 London: Screenrush (AlloCiné) 

Living people
21st-century French actresses
Actresses from Paris
Actresses from Toulouse
Cours Florent alumni
French film actresses
French television actresses
French stage actresses
Year of birth missing (living people)